Hemicrambe socotrana, synonym Nesocrambe socotrana, is a species of flowering plant in the family Brassicaceae. It is found only on "an inhospitable and windswept ridge at the western end of Soqotra", Yemen. It is listed as an endangered species on the IUCN Red List.

References

Brassicaceae
Endemic flora of Socotra
Endangered plants
Taxonomy articles created by Polbot
Taxobox binomials not recognized by IUCN